The Uncensored Library is a Minecraft server and map released by Reporters Without Borders and created by BlockWorks,  DDB Berlin, and MediaMonks as an attempt to circumvent censorship in countries without freedom of the press. The library contains banned reporting from Mexico, Russia, Vietnam, Saudi Arabia, and Egypt. An entire wing is given to each country, each containing several banned articles. The library was released on March 12, 2020, the World Day Against Cyber Censorship. Currently, the two ways to access the library are to download a map from the official website, or to connect to their Minecraft server.

Design 
The library is a large scale project built using a neoclassical architectural style. It is intended to resemble well-established institutions such as the New York Public Library, as well as stylistically allude to the authoritarian structures the project aims to subvert. The library uses over 12.5 million Minecraft blocks.

Format 

Each of the five countries covered by the library, as well as Reporters without Borders, has an individual wing, containing a number of articles, available in English and the original language the article was written in. The texts within the library are contained in in-game book items, which can be opened and placed on stands to be read by multiple players at once. These articles generally discuss censorship, unjust punishment, and other critiques of the writer's government. The interior architecture of each country's room symbolizes each country's unique situation and journalistic challenges. Additionally, the library contains a central room listing the Press Freedom Index and current state of freedom of the press of every country covered by the index, and the Mexican section contains memorials for reporters who were killed due to their writings. In March 2020, the library contained over 200 different books.

A room in the library covers the impact of the COVID-19 pandemic on journalism, containing books on 10 countries (Brazil, China, Egypt, Hungary, Iran, Myanmar, North Korea, Russia, Thailand and Turkmenistan) to show how reporting of the virus in each country has been affected.

"Truth Hegemony" 
The song "Truth Hegemony" that appears in the official promotional video of the library was written by Lucas Mayer and performed by The Client Said No.

Reception 

After launch, the project went viral across social media platforms and has been featured in various media outlets such as the BBC, DW News, CNBC, CNN, Tech Crunch, The Verge, Gizmodo, Engadget, Mashable, PC Gamer and Scene World Magazine.

Notes

References

External links 
 

Censorship of broadcasting
Minecraft servers
Internet properties established in 2020
Censorship in Mexico
Censorship in Russia
Censorship in Vietnam
Censorship in Saudi Arabia
Censorship in Brazil
Censorship in Egypt
Censorship in China
Censorship in Hungary
Censorship in Iran
Censorship in Myanmar
Censorship in North Korea
Censorship in Thailand
Censorship in Turkmenistan
Works about the COVID-19 pandemic